Lady Rowlands (born Mary Allen Neal; April 12, 1904 – May 28, 1999) was an American film actress. Most of her work came in the films of John Cassavetes, who was married to her daughter, the Academy Award-nominated and four-time Emmy Award-winning actress Gena Rowlands.

Life and career
Rowlands was the daughter of Tennessee Virginia (née Hickey) and William Joel Neal of Irish descent. She was married to Edwin Myrwyn Rowlands, a banker and statesman, with whom she lived in Cambria, Wisconsin. They had two children, David and Virginia (later known as Gena Rowlands). She lived as a housewife, but practiced music, acting, and painting as hobbies.

Rowlands later moved to California along with her daughter and son-in-law, actor John Cassavetes. Cassavetes began directing films, and cast Rowlands in three of his pictures. She adopted the screen-name "Lady Rowlands", a nickname given by her grandchildren. In Minnie and Moskowitz (1971) and A Woman Under the Influence (1974), she played the mother of her real-life daughter. Her home was used for the filming of Faces (1968) and The Killing of a Chinese Bookie (1976).

Aside from her work with Cassavetes, Rowlands also appeared in two television movies and had a role in the film Ted & Venus (1991).

Her grandchildren, Nick Cassavetes, Alexandra Cassavetes, and Zoe Cassavetes, are all actors and film directors.

Filmography

References

External links

1904 births
1999 deaths
American film actresses
American people of Irish descent
Cassavetes family
20th-century American actresses
People from Cambria, Wisconsin